Moerbes is a monotypic snout moth genus described by Harrison Gray Dyar Jr. in 1914. Its single species, Moerbes dryopella, was described by William Schaus in 1913, originally as Zophodia dryopella. It was subsequently moved under the genus Moerbes by Dyar. It is found in Panama.

References

Moths described in 1913
Phycitinae
Monotypic moth genera
Moths of Central America